Jiří Vykoukal (born March 11, 1971) is a former Czech professional ice hockey defenceman. He was selected by the Washington Capitals in the 10th round (208th overall) of the 1989 NHL Entry Draft.

Vykoukal played with HC České Budějovice in the Czech Extraliga during the 2010–11 Czech Extraliga season.

Career statistics

Regular season and playoffs

International

References

External links

1971 births
Living people
Baltimore Skipjacks players
Espoo Blues players
Czech ice hockey defencemen
Czechoslovak ice hockey defencemen
Hampton Roads Admirals players
Ice hockey players at the 1994 Winter Olympics
Modo Hockey players
Motor České Budějovice players
HC Olomouc players
Olympic ice hockey players of the Czech Republic
Sportspeople from Olomouc
HC Plzeň players
HC Sparta Praha players
HC TPS players
Washington Capitals draft picks
Czechoslovak expatriate sportspeople in the United States
Czech expatriate ice hockey players in the United States
Czech expatriate ice hockey players in Sweden
Czech expatriate ice hockey players in Finland